La vita è is the sixth studio album by Italian singer-songwriter Nek. It was released in 2000.

Track listing

Charts and certifications

Weekly charts

Year-end charts

Certifications

References

2000 albums
Nek albums